Life in the Countryside (Spanish: La vida en el campo) is an oil on canvas painting by Flemish artists Jan Brueghel the Elder and Joos de Momper. It was painted between 1620 and 1622. The painting is kept in the Museum of Prado in Madrid.

Painting
This painting is today considered a collaboration between Jan Brueghel the Elder and Joos de Momper. The latter would have painted the landscape, the former the figures, as is customary in paintings considered collaborations of the two.

The large trees in midsection split the composition in two, and are "the vertical counterpoint to the horizontal perspective that is projected in the distance." The painting show the influence of Brueghel the Elder on his own son and de Momper in many ways. Notably, the scenic choice and the representation of figures.

References

Further reading
 Rooms, Xavier de , Prado Museum. Catalog of paintings , Prado Museum , Madrid , 1972 .
 Díaz Padrón, Matías , Two canvases by J. Momper attributed to Brueghel , Archivo Español de Arte , 48 , 1975 , pp. 270 / plate 7 .
 Díaz Padrón, Matías , Prado Museum: catalog of paintings. Flamenco School , Prado Museum; National Museum Heritage , Madrid , 1975 , pp. 198 .
 Díaz Padrón, Matías , The Flamenco School of the XVII Century , Ediciones Alfiz , Madrid , 1983 , pp. 67 .
 Museo Nacional del Prado , Museo del Prado. Catalog of paintings , Prado Museum , Madrid , 1985 , pp. 430-431 .
 Museo Nacional del Prado , Museo del Prado: general inventory of paintings (I) The Royal Collection , Museo del Prado, Espasa Calpe , Madrid , 1990 , pp. 1423 .
 Díaz Padrón, Matías , The century of Rubens in the Prado Museum: reasoned catalog , Iberian Press , Barcelona , 1996 , pp. 252 .

External links
The painting at the Museum of Prado

1620 paintings
Paintings of the Museo del Prado by Flemish artists
Landscape paintings
Paintings by Joos de Momper
Paintings by Jan Brueghel the Elder